Rajesh Chandy  is the Tony and Maureen Wheeler Chair in Entrepreneurship and Marketing at London Business School. He is known for his work on innovation. Since 2018, he has been a Fellow of the British Academy.

Selected research publications

Awards 
Mahajan Award for Lifetime Contributions to Marketing Strategy Research
ISMS Practice Prize for research that contributes most to the practice of marketing
Journal of Marketing Harold Maynard Award

References

Living people
Year of birth missing (living people)